Shu Qingchun (3 February 189924 August 1966), known by his pen name Lao She, was a Chinese novelist and dramatist. He was one of the most significant figures of 20th-century Chinese literature, and is best known for his novel Rickshaw Boy and the play Teahouse (茶馆). He was of Manchu ethnicity, and his works are known especially for their vivid use of the Beijing dialect.

Biography

Early life
Lao She was born Shu Qingchun (舒慶春) on 3 February 1899 in Beijing, to a poor Manchu family of the Šumuru clan belonging to the Plain Red Banner. His father, who was a guard soldier, died in a street battle with the Eight-Nation Alliance Forces in the course of the Boxer Rebellion events in 1901. "During my childhood," Lao She later recalled, "I didn't need to hear stories about evil ogres eating children and so forth; the foreign devils my mother told me about were more barbaric and cruel than any fairy tale ogre with a huge mouth and great fangs. And fairy tales are only fairy tales, whereas my mother's stories were 100 percent factual, and they directly affected our whole family." In 1913, he was admitted to the Beijing Normal Third High School (now Beijing Third High School), but had to leave after several months because of financial difficulties. In the same year, he was accepted to Beijing Normal University, from which he graduated in 1918.

Career
Between 1918 and 1924, Lao She was involved as administrator and faculty member at a number of primary and secondary schools in Beijing and Tianjin. He was highly influenced by the May Fourth Movement (1919). He stated, "The May Fourth Movement gave me a new spirit and a new literary language. I am grateful to the May Fourth Movement, as it allowed me to become a writer."

He went on to serve as lecturer in the Chinese section of the School of Oriental Studies (now the School of Oriental and African Studies) at the University of London from 1924 to 1929, living in Notting Hill for most of that period. During his time in London, he absorbed a great deal of English literature (especially Dickens, whom he adored) and began his own writing. His later novel Mr Ma and Son, about a Chinese father and his son in London, drew on these experiences. Up until that time, he had signed his works with his courtesy name She Yu (舍予). In his first novel "Old Zhang's Philosophy" 老张的哲学 Lao Zhang de Zhexue), first published on Fiction Monthly, he first adopted the pen name Lao She. 

In the summer of 1929, he left Britain for Singapore, teaching at the Chinese High School. Between his return to China in the spring of 1930 until 1937, he taught at several universities, including Cheeloo University until 1934, and Shandong University (Qingdao).

Lao She was a major popularizer of humor writing in China, especially through his novels, his short stories and essays for journals like Lin Yutang's "The Analects Fortnightly" (論語半月刊, Lunyu Banyuekan, est. 1932), and his stage plays and other performing arts, notably xiangsheng.

On 27 March 1938, The All-China Resistance Association of Writers and Artists was established with Lao She as its leader. The purpose of this organization was to unite cultural workers against the Japanese, and Lao She was a respected novelist who had remained neutral during the ideological discussions between various literary groups in the preceding years.

In March 1946, Lao She travelled to the United States on a two-year cultural grant sponsored by the State Department, lecturing and overseeing the translation of several of his novels, including The Yellow Storm (1951) and his last novel, The Drum Singers (1952; its Chinese version was not published until 1980). He stayed in the US from 1946 until December 1949. During Lao She's traveling, his friend, Pearl S. Buck, and her husband, had served as sponsors and they helped Lao She live in the U.S. After the People's Republic of China was established, Lao She rejected Buck's advice to stay in America and came back to China. Rickshaw Boy was translated by Buck in the early 1940s. This action helped Rickshaw Boy become a best seller book in America.

Marriage and Family

In 1930, Hu Jiqing was studying at Beijing Normal University. His mother was afraid that she would delay her lifelong events because of her studies. Linguist Mr. Luo Changpei is a friend of Hu Yiqing's brothers. Once, he went to Hu's house to play, and Hu Mu asked him to help him find out. At this time, Lao She happened to be returning from London, and he had written works, so Luo Changpei introduced Lao She to Hu Mu. After learning about Lao She's talent and character, Hu Mu was extremely happy, and privately appointed the son-in-law of Chenglong. Luo discussed together a detailed plan for Lao She and Hu Jiqing to meet. In the winter of 1930, Lao She returned to Peiping. Under Luo's arrangement, Lao She was dragged by friends everywhere to eat, and there was always Hu Yiqing on the dinner table. After frequent meetings, Hu and Shu developed affection. It was not until the summer of 1931 that Hu Yiqing graduated, and the two held a wedding. Half a month after the marriage, Lao She brought his wife to Jinan and continued to teach at the university, while Hu Jiqing taught in a middle school. The first child of the two was born in Jinan, a girl named Shuji. In 1935 the second child, son Shu Yi was born. In 1937, he gave birth to his third child in Chongqing, named Shu Yu. In 1945, the young girl Shu Li was born.

Death
Like numerous other intellectuals in China, Lao She experienced mistreatment when the Cultural Revolution began in 1966. Condemned as a counterrevolutionary, he was paraded and struggled by the Red Guards through the streets and beaten publicly at the door steps of the Temple of Confucius in Beijing. According to the official record, this abuse left Lao She greatly humiliated both mentally and physically, and he committed suicide by drowning himself in Beijing's Taiping Lake on 24 August 1966. Leo Ou-fan Lee mentioned the possibility that Lao She was murdered. However, no reliable information has emerged to verify definitively the actual circumstances of Lao's death. His relatives were accused of implication in his "crimes", but rescued his manuscripts after his death, hiding them in coal piles and a chimney and moving them from house to house.

Works
Lao She's first novel, The Philosophy of Lao Zhang (老张的哲学 Lao Zhang de Zhexue) was written in London (1926) and modeled on Dickens' Nicholas Nickleby, but is set among students in Beijing. His second novel, Zhao Ziyue (赵子曰, 1927) is set in the same Beijing milieu, but tells the story of a 26-year-old college student's quest for the trappings of fame in a corrupt bureaucracy. Both "The Philosophy of Lao Zhang" and "Zhao Ziyue" were Lao She's novels which expressed the native Peking lives and memories. Among Lao She's most famous stories is Crescent Moon (月牙儿, Yuè Yár), written in the early stage of his creative life. It depicts the miserable life of a mother and daughter and their deterioration into prostitution.

Mr Ma and Son 

Mr. Ma and Son showed another writing style for Lao She. He described Mr. Ma and his son's life in London Chinatown, showing the poor situation of Chinese people in London. These were praised as reflecting Chinese students' experiences. Lao She used funny words to show cruel social truths. From "Mr. Ma and Son", Lao She pointed the stereotype included appearances and spirits and he hoped to get rid of these dirty impressions.

Cat Country 

Cat Country is a satirical fable, sometimes seen as the first important Chinese science fiction novel, published in 1932 as a thinly veiled observation on China. Lao She wrote it from the perspective of a visitor to the planet Mars.  The visitor encountered an ancient civilisation populated by cat-people. The civilisation had long passed its glorious peak and had undergone prolonged stagnation.  The visitor observed the various responses of its citizens to the innovations by other cultures. Lao She wrote Cat Country in direct response to Japan's invasion of China (Manchuria in 1931, and Shanghai in 1932). Paradoxically, Cat Country has been considered as an artistic failure by the author himself.

Rickshaw Boy 
His novel Rickshaw Boy (also known in the West as Camel Xiangzi or Rickshaw) was published in 1936. It describes the tragic life of a rickshaw-puller in Beijing of the 1920s, and revealed the tragedy of lower classes at that time through the narration of the rickshaw boy's story. Xiangzi is a stereotype of a social phenomenon: a peasant coming to the city and then turning to an urban tramp, experiencing spiritual crises of all kinds. Not only a problem of particular historical period, it is an all-pervasive one that persists throughout Chinese history. Reading the novel today reveals more about the contemporary Chinese society than the text itself. It is considered to be a classic of modern Chinese literature and a contribution to the genre of world literature about laborers. The publishing of the English translation of Rickshaw Boy has been a milestone for Lao She' international prestige. The English version Rickshaw Boy became a US bestseller in 1945; it was an unauthorized translation that added a bowdlerized happy ending to the story. In 1982, the original version was made into a film of the same title.

Teahouse
is a play in three acts, set in a teahouse called "Yu Tai" in Beijing from 1898 until the eve of the 1949 revolution.  First published in 1957, the play is a social and cultural commentary on the problems, culture, and changes within China during the early twentieth century. It has been translated into many different languages.

Promotion of Baihua (National Language) 
Lao She advocated the use of Baihua, the use of plain language in written Chinese. Baihua evolved a new language from classic Chinese during the May Fourth Movement.  As the All-China League of Resistance Writers leader, he found he needed to abandon the use of classical Chinese for a more accessible modern style. Lao She was an early user of Baihua and other writers and artists followed his lead. Modern written Chinese is largely in the plainer Baihua style.

Treasure Boat 
“Treasure Boat” was written by Lao She in 1961. It was the only children's opera he wrote.

Article style 
Lao She created a unique humorous and ironic writing style, his writing is simple but really deep. Chinese author of humorous, satiric novels and short stories and, after the onset of the Sino-Japanese War (1937–45), of patriotic and propagandistic plays and novels.

Legacy
After the end of the Cultural Revolution, Lao She was posthumously "rehabilitated" in 1978 and his works were republished. Several of his stories have been made into films, including This Life of Mine (1950, dir. by Shi Hui), Dragon Beard Ditch (1952, dir. by Xian Qun), Rickshaw Boy (1982, dir. by Ling Zifeng), The Teahouse (1982, dir. by Xie Tian), The Crescent Moon (1986, dir. by Huo Zhuang), The Drum Singers (1987, dir. by Tian Zhuangzhuang), and The Divorce (1992, dir. by Wang Hao-wei). Tian Zhuangzhuang's adaptation of The Drum Singers, also known as Street Players, was mostly shot on location in Sichuan. Some of Lao She's plays have also been staged in the recent past, including Beneath the Red Banner in 2000 in Shanghai, and Dragon's Beard Ditch in 2009 in Beijing as part of the celebration of the writer's 110th birthday.

Lao She's former home in Beijing is preserved as the Lao She Memorial Hall, opened to the public as a museum of the writer's work and life in 1999. Originally purchased in 1950, when it was 10 Fengsheng Lane, Naicifu, the address of the traditional courtyard house is now 19 Fengfu Lane. It is close to Wangfujing, in Dongcheng District. Lao She lived there until his death 16 years later. The courtyard contains persimmon trees planted by the writer. His wife called the house 'Red Persimmon Courtyard'.

The Lao She Literary Award has been given every two to three years starting in the year 2000. It is sponsored by the Lao She Literature Fund and can only be bestowed on Beijing writers.

The study of Lao She is regarded to be valuable on several counts, as a writer whose life span has covered all stages of modern China - the Ch’ing Dynasty, the Republic and the Communists.

The Laoshe Tea House, a popular tourist attraction in Beijing that opened in 1988 and features regular performances of traditional music, is named after Lao She, but features primarily tourist-oriented attractions.

Three-self principles 
As a philosophy, the three-self principles survived most visibly in China. The Communist government expelled all foreign missionaries in 1950, and in 1954 forced the Protestant churches to merge into a single body, the Three-self Patriotic Movement of Protestant Churches in China. Ostensibly formed to break church reliance on foreign money, influence, and leadership, the movement was actually designed to train leaders in patriotism (support for the government) and to facilitate communication between the government and the Christian community. In 1966, as the Cultural Revolution began and the government attempted to destroy Christianity, the Three-self Movement was disbanded. It was reorganized in 1980. Its main role is to articulate new government policies regarding religion. On a more positive note, it has helped foster the sense that the contemporary Chinese Protestant church is an indigenous body and no longer a branch of a foreign institution.

A pioneer in modem Chinese literature, his work revealed the language, the joys, and the hurts of the common people of China. He believed his country and its Christianity needed to be Chinese-led, and not dependent upon the foreigner for funds and direction.

Notes

Selected works in translation

Fiction
 The Two Mas. Translated by Kenny K. Huang & David Finkelstein. Hong Kong: Joint Publ. Co., 1984.
 Mr Ma and Son: Two Chinese in London. Translated by William Dolby. Edinburgh: W. Dolby,  1987. Republished – Melbourne: Penguin Group, 2013.
 Cat Country, a Satirical Novel of China in the 1930s.(貓城記 / Mao cheng ji) Translated by William A. Lyell.  Columbus: Ohio State University Press,  1970. Reprinted – Melbourne: Penguin Group, 2013.
 The Quest for Love of Lao Lee. Translated by Helena Kuo. New York: Reynal & Hitchcock,  1948.
 Heavensent. Translated by Xiong Deni. London: 1951. Reprinted - Hong Kong: Joint Publ. Co., 1986.
 Rickshaw Boy. (駱駝祥子 /Luo tuo Xiangzi) Translated by Evan King and Illustrated by Cyrus Leroy Baldridge. New York: Reynal & Hitchcock,  1945. Unauthorized.
 Rickshaw. (駱駝祥子 /Luo tuo Xiangzi) Translated by Jean James. Honolulu: University Press of Hawaii,  1979.  
 Camel Xiangzi (駱駝祥子 /Luo tuo Xiangzi) Translated by Xiaoqing Shi. Bloomington; Beijing: Indiana University Press; Foreign Languages Press,  1981.  
 Rickshaw Boy: A Novel. Translated by Howard Goldblatt New York: Harper Perennial Modern Chinese Classics,  2010.  .
 
 The Yellow Storm (also known as Four Generations Under One Roof). New York: Harcourt, Brace,  1951. Translated by Ida Pruitt.
 The Drum Singers. Translated by Helena Kuo.  New York: Harcourt, Brace,  1952. Reprinted - Hong Kong: Joint Publ. Co., 1987.
 Blades of Grass the Stories of Lao She.  Translated by William A. Lyell, Sarah Wei-ming Chen and Howard Goldblatt. Honolulu: University of Hawai'i Press,  1999.  
 Crescent Moon and Other Stories. (月牙兒 Yue ya er) Beijing, China: Chinese Literature,  1985.  
 Beneath the Red Banner. Translated by Don J. Cohn. Beijing: Chinese Literature, 1982.

Plays
 Dragon Beard Ditch: A Play in Three Acts. Peking: Foreign Languages Press,  1956. 
 Teahouse: A Play in Three Acts. Translated by John Howard-Gibbon. Beijing: Foreign Languages Press,  1980; rpr Hong Kong, Chinese University Press. .

Further reading
 Chinese Writers on Writing featuring Lao She. Ed. Arthur Sze. (Trinity University Press, 2010).
 Vohra, Ranbir. Lao She and the Chinese Revolution. Harvard University Asia Center, 1974. Volume 55 of Harvard East Asian Monographs. , 9780674510753.
 Rea, Christopher. The Age of Irreverence: A New History of Laughter in China. University of California Press, 2015. 
 Anne Veronica Witchard, Lao She in London (Hong Kong China: Hong Kong University Press, HKU,  2012). .
 Ch 4, "Melancholy Laughter: Farce and Melodrama in Lao She's Fiction," in Dewei Wang. Fictional Realism in Twentieth-Century China : Mao Dun, Lao She, Shen Congwen. New York: Columbia University Press,  1992. . Google Books: 
Sascha Auerbach, "Margaret Tart, Lao She, and the Opium-Master's Wife: Race and Class among Chinese Commercial Immigrants in London and Australia, 1866–1929," Comparative Studies in Society and History 55, no. 1 (2013):35–64.

Portrait 
    Lao She. A Portrait by Kong Kai Ming at Portrait Gallery of Chinese Writers (Hong Kong Baptist University Library).

External links
 Memorial of Victims of the Cultural Revolution, Lao She (中国文革受难者纪念馆·老舍)
 
 Synopsis of the play "Teahouse."
 Drama "Teahouse" wows American audiences China Daily. 16 November 2005.
 Anne Witchard's article on the London Fictions website about 'Mr Ma and Son'
 Lao She Papers at the Rare Book and Manuscript Library, Columbia University, New York, NY

1899 births
1966 suicides
20th-century Chinese novelists
20th-century Chinese dramatists and playwrights
Academics of SOAS University of London
Chinese dramatists and playwrights
Delegates to the 1st National People's Congress
Delegates to the 2nd National People's Congress
Delegates to the 3rd National People's Congress
Members of the 4th Chinese People's Political Consultative Conference
Manchu people
Manchu Plain Red Bannermen
Republic of China novelists
Academic staff of Shandong University
Suicides by drowning in China
Suicides during the Cultural Revolution
Writers from Beijing
Burials at Babaoshan Revolutionary Cemetery
Persecution of intellectuals
1966 deaths
Dramatists of Chinese opera